Joy Buswell Zedler (born 1943) is an American ecologist and professor of botany at the University of Wisconsin–Madison (UW), holding the title of Aldo Leopold Chair of Restoration Ecology. In addition to restoration ecology, she specializes in the ecology of wetlands, rare species, interactions between native and introduced species, and adaptive management.

Career

After earning a PhD in botany at UW, Zedler in 1969 moved to San Diego, California, as her husband took a job at San Diego State University (SDSU). She became an SDSU faculty member and joined activist Mike McCoy in preventing the Tijuana River Estuary from being developed into a marina. She formed SDSU's Pacific Estuarine Research Laboratory.

In 1998, Zedler became the Aldo Leopold Professor of Restoration Ecology at UW. Zedler credited Leopold, who also worked at UW, with pioneering restoration ecology.

She also in 1998 became director of research for the UW Arboretum. She served in this capacity for 18 years, launching studies into invasive species, including how native plants are able to defend their ecosystems. She was the co-author of a 2010s plan to restore the Mesopotamian Marshes.

Zedler has said that the most immediate impact of wetland destruction—in which "most losses are due to drainage for agriculture"—is a lower denitrification rate, which may raise the level of nitrates in water over the amount safe for children and pregnant women. She has noted that even after wetland restoration efforts, much of the abundance and biodiversity cannot fully recover from damage.

A fellow of the Society of Wetland Scientists and the Ecological Society of America, Zedler edits the journals Restoration Ecology and Ecosystem Health and Sustainability. She is a former member of the board of directors of The Nature Conservancy, the Environmental Defense Fund, and the Wisconsin State Natural Areas Preservation Council.

Honors

 2001 – William A. Niering Outstanding Educator Award, Coastal and Estuarine Research Federation
 Zedler Marsh, part of Los Cerritos Wetlands, is named in her honor.

Selected publications

Journal articles

 
 
 

Books

References

1943 births
Living people
American ecologists
Women ecologists
American women biologists
Fellows of the Ecological Society of America
University of Wisconsin–Madison College of Letters and Science alumni
University of Wisconsin–Madison faculty
San Diego State University faculty
American women academics
21st-century American women